

Y

 
Yafsoanite (garnet: IMA1981-022) 4.CC.25    (IUPAC: tricalcium ditellurium(IV) tri(tetraoxozincate))
Yagiite (milarite: IMA1968-020) 9.CM.05   
Yakhontovite (montmorillonite, smectite: IMA1984-032a) 9.EC.40   
Yakovenchukite-(Y) (IMA2006-002) 9.EF.30   [no]
Yakubovichite (IMA2020-094) 8.0  [no] [no]
Yancowinnaite (tsumcorite: IMA2010-030) 8.0  [no] [no] (IUPAC: lead copper aluminium hydro diarsenate monohydrate)
Yangite (IMA2012-052) 9.D?.  [no] [no] (IUPAC: lead manganese octaoxotrisilicate monohydrate)
Yangzhumingite (mica: IMA2009-017) 9.EC.20  [no]  (IUPAC: dipotassium pentamagnesium icosaoxyoctasilicate tetrafluoride)
Yanomamite (IMA1990-052) 8.CD.10    (IUPAC: indium arsenate dihydrate)
Yarlongite (carbide: IMA2007-035) 1.BA.30   [no] (IUPAC: (tetrachromium tetrairon nickel) tetracarbide)
Yaroshevskite (IMA2012-003) 8.0  [no] [no] (IUPAC: nonacopper dichloro dioxo tetravanadate)
Yaroslavite (IMA1968 s.p., 1966) 3.CB.50    (IUPAC: tricalcium dihydro decafluorodialuminate monohydrate)
Yarrowite (IMA1978-022) 2.CA.05d    (IUPAC: nonacopper octasulfide)
Yarzhemskiite (IMA2018-019) 6.0  [no] [no] (IUPAC: potassium [dihydro heptaoxo pentaborate] monohydrate)
Yavapaiite (IMA1962 s.p., 1959) 7.AC.15    (IUPAC: potassium iron(III) disulfate)
Yazganite (alluaudite: IMA2003-033) 8.AC.10    (IUPAC: sodium magnesium diiron(III) triarsenate monohydrate)
Yeatmanite (Y: 1938) 9.AE.45   
Yecoraite (tellurite-tellurium oxysalt: IMA1983-062) 7.DF.70    (IUPAC: triiron(III) pentabismuth nonaoxo trioxotellurate(IV) di(tetraoxotellurate(VI)) nonahydrate)
Yedlinite (IMA1974-001) 3.DB.50   
Ye'elimite (IMA1984-052) 7.BC.15    (IUPAC: tetracalcium hexaluminium dodecaoxide sulfate)
Yegorovite (IMA2008-033) 9.00.   [no]
Yeomanite (IMA2013-024) 3.0  [no] [no] (IUPAC: dilead chloro oxohydroxide)
Yftisite-(Y)ch (Y: 1971) 9.AG.25   [no] Note: discredited 1987, but crystal-structure determination was reported (Balko & Bakakin, 1975).
Yimengite (magnetoplumbite: IMA1982-046) 4.CC.45   
Yingjiangite (phosphuranylite: IMA1989-001) 8.EC.10    (IUPAC: dipotassium calcium heptauranyl hexahydro tetraphosphate hexahydrate)
Yixunite (auricupride: IMA1995-042) 1.AG.50    (IUPAC: triplatinum indium alloy)
Yoderite (IMA1962 s.p., 1959) 9.AF.25   
Yofortierite (palygorskite: IMA1974-045) 9.EE.20   
Yoshimuraite (seidozerite, bafertisite: IMA1967 s.p., 1961) 9.BE.42   
Yoshiokaite (feldspathoid, nepheline: IMA1989-043) 9.FA.05   
Yttriaite-(Y) (IMA2010-039) 4.CC.  [no] [no] (IUPAC: diyttrium trioxide)
Yttrialite-(Y) (IMA1987 s.p., 1889) 9.BC.05   
Yttrocolumbite-(Y)Q (IMA1987 s.p., 1837) 4.DB.25    Note: possibly samarskite-(Y).
Yttrocrasite-(Y)Q (columbite: IMA1987 s.p., 1906) 4.DG.05    Note: its description is poor and so it is questionable.
Yttrotantalite-(Y) (IMA1987 s.p., 1802) 4.DG.10   
Yttrotungstite 4.FD.20 (IUPAC: REE ditungsten trihydro hexaoxide)
Yttrotungstite-(Ce) (IMA1970-008) 4.FD.20   [no]
Yttrotungstite-(Y) (IMA1987 s.p., 1927) 4.FD.20   
Yuanfuliite (IMA1994-001) 6.AB.20   
Yuanjiangite (tin alloy: IMA1993-028) 1.AC.15    (IUPAC: gold stannide)
Yugawaralite (zeolitic tectosilicate: IMA1997 s.p., 1952) 9.GB.15   
Yukonite (Y: 1913) 8.DM.25    (IUPAC: dicalcium triiron(III) tetrahydro triarsenate tetrahydrate)
Yuksporite (Y: 1923) 9.DG.95   
Yurgensonite (IMA2019-059) 8.0  [no] [no] (IUPAC: dipotassium tin titanium dioxo diarsenate)
Yurmarinite (anhydrous arsenate: IMA2013-033) 8.0  [no] [no]
Yushkinite (valleriite: IMA1983-050) 2.FD.30   
Yusupovite (IMA2014-022) 9.D?.  [no] [no]
Yuzuxiangite (ohmilite: IMA2020-084)  [no] [no]
Yvonite (IMA1995-012) 8.CB.25    (IUPAC: copper hydroxoarsenate(V) dihydrate)

Z

 

Żabińskiite (titanite: IMA2015-033) 9.AG.15  [no] [no]
Zabuyelite (IMA1985-018) 5.AA.05    (IUPAC: dilithium carbonate)
Zaccagnaite (hydrotalcite: IMA1997-019) 5.DA.45    (IUPAC: tetrazinc dialuminium dodecahydroxide carbonate trihydrate)
Zaccariniite (IMA2011-086) 2.0  [no]  (IUPAC: rhenium nickel arsenide)
Zadovite (zadovite, arctite: IMA2013-031) 8.0  [no] [no] (IUPAC: barium hexacalcium fluoro [tetraoxosilicate phosphate] diphosphate)
Zagamiite (IMA2015-022a) 9.0  [no] [no] (IUPAC: dicalcium tetraluminium undecaoxoheptasilicate)
Zaherite (IMA1977-002) 7.DE.65    (IUPAC: dodecaluminium hexaicosahydro pentasulfate icosahydrate)
Zaïrite (alunite, crandallite: IMA1975-018) 8.BL.13    (IUPAC: bismuth triiron(III) hexahydro diphosphate)
Zakharovite (IMA1981-049) 9.EE.65    (IUPAC: tetrasodium pentamanganese(V) tetraicosaoxodecasilicate hexahydroxyl hexahydrate)
Zálesíite (mixite: IMA1997-009) 8.DL.15   [no] (IUPAC: calcium hexacopper diarsenate hydroxoarsenate(V) hexahydroxide trihydrate)
Zanazziite (roscherite: IMA1986-054) 8.DA.10    (IUPAC: dicalcium tetraberyllium pentamagnesium tetrahydro hexaphosphate hexahydrate)
Zangboite (silicide: IMA2007-036) 1.BB.  [no]  (IUPAC: titanum iron disilicide)
Zapatalite (IMA1971-023) 08.DE.20    (IUPAC: tricopper tetraluminium nonahydro triphosphate tetrahydrate)
ZaratiteQ (amorphous: 1934) 5.DA.15    (IUPAC: trinickel carbonate tetrahydroxide tetrahydrate) Note: partially amorphous.
Zavalíaite (olivine: IMA2011-012) 8.0  [no]  (IUPAC: trimanganese(II) diphosphate)
Zavaritskite (matlockite: IMA1967 s.p., 1962) 3.DC.25    (IUPAC: bismuth oxofluoride)
Zaykovite (IMA2019-084) 2.0  [no] [no] (IUPAC: trirhenium tetraselenide)
Zdeněkite (lavendulan: IMA1992-037) 8.DG.05    (IUPAC: sodium lead pentacopper chloro tetrarsenate pentahydrate)
Zektzerite (IMA1976-034) 9.DN.05    (IUPAC: sodium lithium zirconium pentadecaoxohexasilicate)
Zellerite (IMA1965-031) 5.EC.10    (IUPAC: calcium uranyl dicarbonate pentahydrate)
Zemannite (zemannite: IMA1968-009) 4.JM.05   
Zemkorite (IMA1985-041) 5.AC.10    (IUPAC: disodium calcium dicarbonate)
Zenzénite (IMA1990-031) 4.CC.55    (IUPAC: trilead tetrairon(III) trimanganese(IV) pentadecaoxide)
Zeophyllite (Y: 1902) 9.EE.70   
Zeravshanite (IMA2003-034) 9.EA.75    (IUPAC: disodium tetracaesium trizirconium pentatetracontaoxooctadecasilicate dihydrate)
Zeunerite (autunite: 1872) 8.EB.05    (IUPAC: copper diuranyl diarsenate dodecahydrate)
Zhanghengite (iron: IMA1985-049) 1.AB.10a    (IUPAC: copper zinc alloy)
Zhanghuifenite (alluaudite: IMA2016-074) 8.0  [no] [no] (IUPAC: trisodium tetramanganese(II) dimagnesium aluminium hexaphosphate)
Zhangpeishanite (matlockite: IMA2006-045) 3.DC.25    (IUPAC: barium fluoride chloride)
Zharchikhite (IMA1986-059) 3.AC.05    (IUPAC: aluminium dihydroxide fluoride)
Zhemchuzhnikovite (oxalate: 1963) 10.AB.35   
Zhengminghuaite (IMA2022-047) 2.  [no] [no]
Zhenruite (IMA2022-050) 4.CB. [no] [no]
Zheshengite (IMA2022-011) 8.BH.  [no] [no]
Zhiqinite (silicide: IMA2019-077) 1.0  [no] [no] (IUPAC: titanium disilicide)
Ziesite (IMA1979-055) 8.FA.10    (IUPAC: beta-dicopper heptaoxodivanadate(V))
Zigrasite (IMA2008-046) 8.CE.75  [no]  (IUPAC: magnesium zirconium diphosphate tetrahydrate)
Zimbabweite (IMA1984-034) 4.JA.40   
Ziminaite (howardevansite: IMA2014-062) 8.0  [no] [no] (IUPAC: hexairon(III) hexavanadate)
Zinc (element: old) 1.AB.05   
Zincalstibite (hydrotalcite: IMA1998-033) 4.FB.10   [no] (IUPAC: dizinc aluminium hexahydroxide [antimony hexahydroxide])
ZincaluminiteQ (woodwardite: 1881) 7.DD.35    Note: undetermined X-ray powder diffraction pattern and unknown crystallography.
Zincgartrellite (tsumcorite: IMA1998-014) 8.CG.20    (IUPAC: lead dizinc di(water,hydro) diarsenate)
Zincite (wurzite: 1845) 4.AB.20    (IUPAC: zinc oxide)
Zinclipscombite (IMA2006-008) 8.BB.90   [no] (IUPAC: zinc diiron(III) dihydro diphosphate)
Zincmelanterite (melanterite: IMA2007 s.p., 1920) 7.CB.35    (IUPAC: zinc sulfate heptahydrate)
Zincoberaunite (beraunite: IMA2015-117) 8.0  [no] [no] (IUPAC: zinc pentairon(III) pentahydro tetraphosphate hexahydrate)
Zincobotryogen (IMA2015-107, 1964) 7.DC.25    (IUPAC: zinc pentairon(III) hydro disulfate heptahydrate)
Zincobradaczekite (alluaudite: IMA2016-041) 8.0  [no] [no] (NaCuCuZn2(AsO4)3)
Zincobriartite (stannite: IMA2015-094) 2.0  [no] [no]
Zincochromite (spinel, spinel: IMA1986-015) 4.BB.05    (IUPAC: zinc dichromium(III) tetraoxide)
Zincocopiapite (copiapite: 1964) 7.DB.35    (IUPAC: zinc tetrairon(III) dihydro hexasulfate icosahydrate)
Zincohögbomite (högbomite, zincohögbomite) 4.CB.20
Zincohögbomite-2N2S (IMA1994-016) 4.CB.20   [no]
Zincohögbomite-2N6S (IMA2001 s.p., 1952) 4.CB.20   [no]
Zincolibethenite (andalusite: IMA2003-010) 8.BB.30    (IUPAC: copper zinc hydro phosphate)
Zincolivenite (andalusite: IMA2006-047) 8.BB.30   [no] (IUPAC: copper zinc hydro arsenate)
Zincomenite (IMA2014-014) 7.A0.  [no] [no] (IUPAC: zinc selenite)
Zinconigerite (högbomite, nigerite) 4.FC.20
Zinconigerite-2N1S (IMA2018-037) 4.FC.20  [no] [no]
Zinconigerite-6N6SN (högbomite: IMA2002 s.p.) 4.FC.20  [no] [no]
Zincospiroffite (tellurite: IMA2002-047) 4.JK.10    (IUPAC: dizinc tritellurium octaoxide)
Zincostaurolite (IMA1992-036) 9.AF.30   [no] (IUPAC: dizinc nonaluminium triicosaoxotetrasilicate hydroxyl)
Zincostrunzite (strunzite: IMA2016-023) 8.0  [no] [no] (IUPAC: dizinc tetrairon(III) tetrahydro tetraphosphate tridecahydrate)
Zincovelesite-6N6S (högbomite: IMA2017-034) 4.0  [no] [no]
Zincovoltaite (voltaite: IMA1985-059) 7.CC.25    (IUPAC: dipotassium pentazinc triiron(III) aluminium dodecasulfate octadecahydrate)
Zincowoodwardite (hydrotalcite: IMA1998-026) 7.DD.35   
ZincrosasiteQ (malachite: 1952) 5.BA.10    Note: description incomplete, possibly rosasite.
Zincroselite (roselite: IMA1985-055) 8.CG.10    (IUPAC: dicalcium zinc diarsenate dihydrate)
Zincsilite (saponite, smectite: 1960) 9.EC.45   
Zinczippeite (zippeite: IMA1971-008) 7.EC.05    (IUPAC: dizinc tetrauranyl tetraoxo disulfate heptahydrate)
Zinkenite (Y: 1826) 2.JB.35a    (Pb9Sb22S42)
ZinkositeQ (zinkosite: 1852) 7.AB.10  [no] [no] (IUPAC: zinc sulfate) Note: possibly a chemical analysis artifact as its occurrence is improbable at the type locality.
Zippeite (zippeite: IMA1971-002a Rd) 7.EC.05    (IUPAC: tripotassium tetrauranyl trioxohydro disulfate trihydrate)
Zircon (zircon: old) 9.AD.30    (IUPAC: zirconium(IV) tetraoxosilicate)
Zirconolite (zirconolite-laachite: IMA1989 s.p., 1956 Rd) 4.DH.30    (IUPAC: calcium zirconium dititanium heptaoxide) Zirconolite-laachite: three polytypoids known (2M, 3O, 3T), laachite.
Zircophyllite (astrophyllite: IMA1971-047) 9.DC.05   
Zircosulfate (Y: 1965) 7.CD.50    (IUPAC: zirconium disulfate tetrahydrate)
Zirkelite (fluorite: IMA1989 s.p., 1895 Rd) 4.DL.05   
ZirkleriteQ (Y: 1928) 3.CJ.30    Note: chemical formula uncertain.
Zirsilite-(Ce) (eudialyte: IMA2002-057) 9.CO.10   [no]
Zirsinalite (lovozerite: IMA1973-025) 9.CJ.15a    (IUPAC: hexasodium calcium zirconium octadecaoxohexasilicate)
Zlatogorite (nickeline: IMA1994-014) 2.CC.05    (IUPAC: copper nickel diantimonide)
Znamenskyite (IMA2014-026) 2.0  [no] [no] (IUPAC: tetralead diindium tridecasulfa tetrabismuthide)
Znucalite (IMA1989-033) 5.ED.45    (IUPAC: calcium undecazinc uranyl icosahydro tricarbonate tetrahydrate)
Zodacite (calcioferrite: IMA1987-014) 8.DH.25    (IUPAC: tetracalcium manganese(IV) tetrairon(IV) tetrahydro hexaphosphate dodecahydrate)
Zoharite (djerfisherite: IMA2017-049) 2.0  [no] [no]
Zoisite (epidote supergroup) 9.BG.10 (IUPAC: metal calcium trialuminium heptaoxosilicate tetraoxosilicate oxyhydroxyl)
Zoisite (Y: 1805) 9.BG.10   
Zoisite-(Pb) (IMA2021-025) 9.BG.10  [no] [no]
Zolenskyite (IMA2020-070) 2.0  [no] [no]
Zolotarevite (IMA2020-076) 9.0  [no] [no]
Zoltaiite (IMA2003-006) 9.AG.85   [no] (IUPAC: barium divanadium(IV) dodecavanadium(III) heptaicosaoxodisilicate)
Zorite (IMA1972-011) 9.DG.45   
Zoubekite (IMA1983-032) 2.HC.35    (AgPb4Sb4S10)
Zubkovaite (IMA2018-008) 8.0  [no] [no]
Zugshunstite-(Ce) (sulfate-oxalate: IMA1996-055) 10.AB.75   
Zuktamrurite (phosphide: IMA2013-107) 1.BD.  [no] [no] (IUPAC: iron diphosphide)
Zunyite (Y: 1885) 9.BJ.55    (IUPAC: tridecaluminium icosaoxopentasilicate octadeca(hydro,fluoro) chloride)
Zussmanite (IMA1964-018) 9.EG.35   
Zvĕstovite-(Zn) (tetrahedrite: IMA2020-061) 2.0  [no] [no]
Zvyaginite (seidozerite, lamprophyllite: IMA2013-071) 9.B?.  [no] 
Zvyagintsevite (auricupride: IMA1966-006) 1.AG.10    (IUPAC: tripalladium lead alloy)
Zwieselite (triplite-zwieselite series: IMA2008 s.p., 1841 Rd) 8.BB.10    (IUPAC: iron(II) manganese(II) fluoro phosphate)
Zýkaite (sanjuanite-destinezite: IMA1976-039) 8.DB.45    (IUPAC: tetrairon(III) hydro triarsenate sulfate pentadecahydrate)

External links
IMA Database of Mineral Properties/ RRUFF Project
Mindat.org - The Mineral Database
Webmineral.com
Mineralatlas.eu minerals Y and Z